The Church of Saint Francis of Assisi in Acilia is a Roman Catholic titular church in Acilia, a northwestern suburb of Rome, built as a parish church in the 1950s. On 21 February 2001 Pope John Paul II made it a titular church as a seat for Cardinals.

The present Cardinal Priest of the Titulus San Francisci Assisiensis in Acilia is Wilfrid Fox Napier.

List of Cardinal Priests 
 Wilfrid Fox Napier (21 February 2001 – present)

References

Francesco Assisi Ad Acilia
Francesco Assisi Ad Acilia